Identity is the fifth studio album primarily written and conducted by American hip hop music group Far East Movement. It was released on October 21, 2016 through Spinnin' Records and Transparent Agency. The album features artists from diverse backgrounds, especially those from Korea and America, as a nod to Far East Movement's Koreatown origins. The band itself describes the album as "a Far East Movement, in a sense, bridging artists from the east with artists from the west while fusing different genres we love."

Background
The album was created after Far East Movement's hiatus. The group members were discouraged after facing racism from the public and the music industry. The band traveled to Asia and there began plotting out an album that "could bridge the gap between Asia and America". As reflected in the title, the album was intended to explore the artists' joint Asian and American identities, as well as collaborate with artists from both backgrounds.

Production
The album features the likes of Yoon Mi-rae, Autolaser, Marshmello, Chanyeol, Tinashe, Candice Pillay, No Riddim, Elijah Blake, Tiffany, King Chain, Jay Park, MNEK, Hyolyn, Gill Chang, Soulja Boy, Loco, Big K.R.I.T., MIKNNA, Macy Gray and Urban Zakapa.

As Far East Movement wanted to collaborate with artists on both sides of the Pacific, they flew back and forth between the US and South Korea. Kevin Nishimura described collaborating with artists as a "slow and challenging process that involved building and nurturing relationships with artists."

The album was the first album released by Far East Movement's own company, Transparent Agency.

Critical reception
Crystal Leww of MTV commented, "Identity is a distinctly Asian-American album, and it speaks to the very specific experience of a group of people who are often seen as foreigners in their own home. But there’s no sense of loss here – Far East Movement have made a cohesive, exciting celebration of that hybrid life." Neil Z. Young of AllMusic rated the album four stars out of five, describing it as a "mature and transformative effort that succeeds in honoring their roots by bridging the gap between their Asian and American cultures."

Track listing

Charts

References

2016 albums
Far East Movement albums
Albums produced by MNEK
Spinnin' Records albums